Estádio Asa Delta is a multi-use stadium located in Primavera do Leste, Mato Grosso state, Brazil. It is used mostly for football matches and hosts the home matches of Sociedade Esportiva e Recreativa Juventude. The stadium has a maximum capacity of 5,000 people.

References

Football venues in Mato Grosso
Sports venues in Mato Grosso